Kings Bay Base is a census-designated place (CDP) in Camden County, Georgia, United States; it is home to the Kings Bay Naval Submarine Base. The population was 1,777 at the 2010 census.

Geography

Kings Bay Base is located in southeastern Camden County at  (30.798022, -81.564966). It is bordered to the west by the city of St. Marys.

Demographics

As of the census of 2000, there were 2,599 people, 429 households, and 425 families residing in the CDP. The racial makeup of the CDP was 72.41% White, 20.01% African American, 0.50% Native American, 0.81% Asian, 0.08% Pacific Islander, 3.73% from other races, and 2.46% from two or more races. Hispanic or Latino of any race were 8.00% of the population.

There were 429 households, out of which 75.5% had children under the age of 18 living with them, 95.6% were married couples living together, 2.1% had a female householder with no husband present, and 0.7% were non-families. 0.7% of all households were made up of individuals.  The average household size was 3.47 and the average family size was 3.48.

In the CDP, the population was spread out, with 24.7% under the age of 18, 46.2% from 18 to 24, 28.1% from 25 to 44, and 1.0% from 45 to 64.  The median age was 22 years. For every 100 females, there were 230.2 males.  For every 100 females age 18 and over, there were 320.9 males.

The median income for a household in the CDP was $33,438, and the median income for a family was $33,438. Males had a median income of $19,122 versus $17,721 for females. The per capita income for the CDP was $12,609.  About 6.1% of families and 7.5% of the population were below the poverty line, including 10.0% of those under age 18.

Education

Higher education 
Valdosta State University - Kings Bay Center
Brenau University - Kings Bay Campus

References

External links
News and information for Kings Bay and Camden county

Census-designated places in Camden County, Georgia